Haifeng County (postal: Hoifung) is a county under the administration of Shanwei, in the southeast of Guangdong Province, China.

History

Hakka peasants from nearby villages of Chengxiang county (modern-day Meixian) immigrated to Haifeng, forming numerous Hakka rural settlements in the county.

Administrative divisions
Haifeng County currently comprises 16 administrative town. They are:
 Meilong town (梅陇镇)
 Xiaomo subdistrict
 Houmen town (鲘门镇)
 Lianan town (联安镇)
 Yaohe town (陶河镇)
 Chikeng town (赤坑镇)
 Dahu town (大湖镇)
 Ketang town (可塘镇)
 Huangqiang town (黄羌镇)
 Pingdong town (平东镇)
 Haicheng town (海城镇)
 Ebu subdistrict (鹅埠街道)
 Chishi subdistrict (赤石街道)
 Gongping town (公平镇)
 Fucheng town (附城镇)
 Chengdong town (城东镇)

Languages

Hoklo (Ho̍-lóh) and Hakka (Hak-kâ-fa) are used in the area.

Climate

References

External links

  

 
County-level divisions of Guangdong
Shanwei